Dadi Theater Circuit is a Chinese cinema chain. As of December 2015, it was China's second-largest cinema chain, with 276 cinemas operating 1,300 screens. As of 2016, it had 1,911 screens in 350 cinemas.

References

Cinema chains in China